Baseball Digest is a baseball magazine resource, published in Orlando, Florida by Grandstand Publishing, LLC. It is the longest-running baseball magazine in the United States.

History and profile
It was created by Herbert F. Simons, a sportswriter for the Chicago Daily Times, in 1942. Simons first published the magazine in August 1942, and served as its editor-in-chief until 1963. In 1981, Joan Whaley was published as its first female contributor.

After publishing on a 9 or 12 issues per-year schedule, in 2009 it scaled back to six with National and American League schedules, directories, pre-season rosters, Major League Baseball history, and one-on-one player interviews, such as in the "Game I'll Never Forget" feature.

In March 2012, Baseball Digest merged with professional scouting service ProScouts LLC. The relaunch included major changes to the magazine's format including being published in full-color for the first time, an increase in editorial content such as scouting reports by veteran MLB scouts, and more newsstand availability.

Other current features include batting, pitching and fielding statistics, a "fans speak out" letters section, player profiles, trivia questions in a Quick Quiz, previews, rules review, a crossword puzzle, and analysis of upcoming prospects. In addition, Baseball Digest has provided season-ending awards for decades: Baseball Digest Player of the Year, Pitcher of the Year, and Rookie of the Year, plus annually presents its All-Star rookie team award.

In May 2018, Rick Cerrone, former Public Relations Director with the New York Yankees (and not to be confused with the Yankees catcher of a similar name), became the fourth editor in the iconic magazine's history. Cerrone was tasked with 're-imagining the publication from the ground up beginning with the September/October issue of 2018. Starting with the January/February 2019 issue, the publication upgraded to a heavier paper stock and increased the number of pages published.

Grandstand Publishing, LLC, announced July 4, 2019, the introduction of BaseballDigestArchive.com, a web-based subscription service that provides users the opportunity to read, search and explore every issue of Baseball Digest ever published—more than 800 issues, 64,000 pages, and 77,000 features in total. It includes past articles published by the magazine, with statistics and articles related to specific teams or players, as well as past scouting reports.

In May 2021, ProScouts LLC, headed by entrepreneur David Fagley, purchased the remaining outstanding shares held by long-time Publisher Norman Jacobs, who remains on as Publisher Emeritus.

Baseball Digest Player of the Year

 1969: Tom Seaver, New York Mets
 1970: Billy Williams, Chicago Cubs
 1971: Joe Torre, St. Louis Cardinals
 1972: Dick Allen, Chicago White Sox
 1973: Pete Rose, Cincinnati Reds
 1974: Lou Brock, St. Louis Cardinals
 1975: Joe Morgan, Cincinnati Reds
 1976: Joe Morgan, Cincinnati Reds
 1977: George Foster, Cincinnati Reds
 1978: Ron Guidry, New York Yankees
 1979: George Brett, Kansas City Royals
 1980: George Brett, Kansas City Royals
 1981: Mike Schmidt, Philadelphia Phillies
 1982: Robin Yount, Milwaukee Brewers
 1983: Carlton Fisk, Chicago White Sox
 1984: Ryne Sandberg, Chicago Cubs
 1985: Dwight Gooden, New York Mets
 1986: Roger Clemens, Boston Red Sox
 1987: Andre Dawson, Chicago Cubs
 1988: José Canseco, Oakland Athletics
 1989: Will Clark, San Francisco Giants
 1990: Ryne Sandberg, Chicago Cubs
 1991: Cal Ripken Jr., Baltimore Orioles
 1992: Roberto Alomar, Toronto Blue Jays
 1993: Barry Bonds, San Francisco Giants
 1994: Jeff Bagwell, Houston Astros
 1995: Albert Belle, Cleveland Indians
 1996: Alex Rodriguez, Seattle Mariners
 1997: Larry Walker, Colorado Rockies
 1998: Sammy Sosa, Chicago Cubs
 1999: Iván Rodríguez, Texas Rangers
 2000: Todd Helton, Colorado Rockies
 2001: Barry Bonds, San Francisco Giants
 2002: Barry Bonds, San Francisco Giants
 2003: Iván Rodríguez, Florida Marlins
 2004: Vladimir Guerrero, Anaheim Angels
 2005: Albert Pujols, St. Louis Cardinals
 2006: Derek Jeter, New York Yankees
 2007: Jimmy Rollins, Philadelphia Phillies
 2008: Albert Pujols, St. Louis Cardinals
 2009: Joe Mauer, Minnesota Twins
 2010: Josh Hamilton, Texas Rangers
 2011: Ryan Braun, Milwaukee Brewers
 2012: Miguel Cabrera, Detroit Tigers
 2013: Miguel Cabrera, Detroit Tigers
 2014: Mike Trout, Los Angeles Angels of Anaheim
 2015: Bryce Harper, Washington Nationals
 2016: Kris Bryant, Chicago Cubs
 2017: José Altuve, Houston Astros
 2018: Mookie Betts, Boston Red Sox
 2019: Mike Trout, Los Angeles Angels
 2020: Freddie Freeman, Atlanta Braves
 2021: Shohei Ohtani, Los Angeles Angels
 2022: Aaron Judge, New York Yankees

Baseball Digest Pitcher of the Year 

 1994: Greg Maddux, Atlanta Braves
 1995: Greg Maddux, Atlanta Braves
 1996: John Smoltz, Atlanta Braves
 1997: Roger Clemens, Toronto Blue Jays
 1998: Kevin Brown, San Diego Padres
 1999: Pedro Martínez, Boston Red Sox
 2000: Pedro Martínez, Boston Red Sox
 2001: Curt Schilling, Arizona Diamondbacks
 2002: Randy Johnson, Arizona Diamondbacks
 2003: Roy Halladay, Toronto Blue Jays
 2004: Curt Schilling, Boston Red Sox
 2005: Dontrelle Willis, Florida Marlins
 2006: Johan Santana, Minnesota Twins
 2007: Josh Beckett, Boston Red Sox
 2008: Cliff Lee, Cleveland Indians
 2009: Zack Greinke, Kansas City Royals
 2010: Roy Halladay, Philadelphia Phillies
 2011: Justin Verlander, Detroit Tigers
 2012: David Price, Tampa Bay Rays
 2013: Max Scherzer, Detroit Tigers
 2014: Clayton Kershaw, Los Angeles Dodgers
 2015: Jake Arrieta, Chicago Cubs
 2016: Jon Lester, Chicago Cubs
 2017: Corey Kluber, Cleveland Indians
 2018: Jacob deGrom, New York Mets
 2019: Justin Verlander, Houston Astros
 2020: Shane Bieber, Cleveland Indians
 2021: Max Scherzer, Los Angeles Dodgers
 2022: Sandy Alcántara, Miami Marlins

See also
 Baseball awards#Other individual awards

References

External links
 www.baseballdigest.com—official site
 www.baseballdigestarchive.com—official archive site
 Baseball Digest All-Star Rookie Teams: 1971–2006

Bimonthly magazines published in the United States
Sports magazines published in the United States
Digest
Magazines established in 1942
Magazines published in Illinois